Same-sex marriage has been legal in Durango since 19 September 2022 in accordance with an executive order issued by Governor Esteban Villegas Villarreal the previous day, addressed to officials of the state civil registry that same-sex couples can marry in the state. The Congress of Durango passed same-sex marriage legislation three days later.

Legal history

Background

On 12 June 2015, the Supreme Court of Justice of the Nation ruled that state bans on same-sex marriage are unconstitutional nationwide. The court's ruling is considered a "jurisprudential thesis" and did not invalidate state laws, meaning that same-sex couples denied the right to marry would still have to seek individual amparos in court. The ruling standardized the procedures for judges and courts throughout Mexico to approve all applications for same-sex marriages and made the approval mandatory. The court based its decision on Article 4 of the Constitution of Mexico, which respects matrimonial equality, stating that "Man and woman are equal under the law. The law shall protect the organization and development of the family."

In December 2013, a couple, known as Víctor and Julián, became the first same-sex couple to marry in Durango, after they obtained an amparo from a court in Durango City. The amparo had been appealed to the Supreme Court, which ruled in favor of the couple. On 13 November 2014, it was announced that 18 people had filed an amparo for same-sex marriage rights in the state. A first hearing was scheduled for 27 November 2014. Representatives from the Congress of Durango argued against the amparo in court, stating that challenges to provisions of the Civil Code had to be made within 30 days of enactment, thus the plaintiffs were "66 years too late". In April 2015, the 18 couples hit another setback when the state claimed they could not seek an amparo because they were not residents of the state. The couples reiterated their intention to take their case to the Supreme Court if needed. 51 same-sex couples had married via the recurso de amparo remedy by September 2022.

Legislative action
In September 2013, Deputy Israel Soto Peña from the Party of the Democratic Revolution introduced a bill to the Congress of Durango to legalize same-sex marriage. On 10 April 2014, the bill was rejected on the basis that it would not sufficiently address the legal changes necessary to amend the Civil Code. In May, Soto Peña announced that he would revamp the measure and resubmit it, which he did on 1 November 2014. On 10 February 2016, the Justice Commission of the Congress of Durango approved the draft bill. However, the bill's plenary discussion was postponed for 6 months to organize discussions on the matter and to inform legislators on the subject before a vote. On 31 January 2017, Congress rejected the bill in a 4–15 vote with 4 abstentions. The four deputies in favor were members of the PRD and the conservative National Action Party (PAN), while those opposed were mostly members of the Institutional Revolutionary Party (PRI). The July 2018 elections resulted in the National Revolutionary Movement (MORENA), PRD and the Labor Party (PT), which have expressed support for same-sex marriage in their party platforms, winning the majority of legislative seats in Durango.

In July 2022 a federal judge ordered the Congress of Durango to consider a same-sex-marriage bill in its next legislative session. The ruling did not require a particular vote but required legislators to go on record as to whether they would vote to legalize same-sex marriage in accordance with Supreme Court jurisprudence. The court set its deadline until 1 September 2022. For the following two months, members of Congress delayed discussions on the bill and postponed votes several times. On 21 September 2022, only three days after Governor Villegas Villarreal issued an executive decree legalizing same-sex marriage in Durango, Congress voted 15–9 to pass a bill codifying the right to same-sex marriage in the Civil Code and amending non-discrimination laws to include sexual orientation. The bill was published in the official journal on 9 October 2022, and took effect the following day.

Article 141 of the Civil Code was amended to read:
 in Spanish: 
 (Officials empowered by law to celebrate marriages will guarantee non-discrimination based on: ethnic or national origin, gender, disability, social status, health condition, religion, opinion, sexual preference or any other reason that violates human dignity and is intended to nullify or undermine human rights.)

Executive decree (2022)
On 18 September 2022, Governor Esteban Villegas Villarreal, in office for only three days, published an executive order legalizing same-sex marriage in Durango. The decree was signed by the Secretary of General of Government, Héctor Vela Valenzuela, published in the state's official journal, and took effect the following day, 19 September 2022. It instructed officials of the state civil registry to issue marriage licenses to same-sex couples, to perform marriage ceremonies for all couples without discrimination, and removed the requirement of couples to obtain a judicial amparo. Villegas Villarreal cited similar decrees in other states, including in Chihuahua in 2015, Baja California in 2017, and Guanajuato in 2021.

Public opinion
According to a 2018 survey by the National Institute of Statistics and Geography, 39% of the Durango public opposed same-sex marriage.

See also
 Same-sex marriage in Mexico
 LGBT rights in Mexico

References

External links
 Executive decree issued by Governor Villegas Villarreal legalizing same-sex marriage

Durango
Durango
2022 in LGBT history